In Greek mythology, Sisyphus or Sisyphos (Ancient Greek: Σίσυφος Sísyphos) was the founder and king of Ephyra (now known as Corinth). Hades punished him for cheating death twice by forcing him to roll an immense boulder up a hill only for it to roll back down every time it neared the top, repeating this action for eternity. Through the classical influence on modern culture, tasks that are both laborious and futile are therefore described as Sisyphean.

Etymology 
R. S. P. Beekes has suggested a pre-Greek origin and a connection with the root of the word  (σοφός, "wise").

Family 
Sisyphus was formerly a Thessalian prince as the son of King Aeolus of Aeolia and Enarete, daughter of Deimachus. He was the brother of Athamas, Salmoneus, Cretheus, Perieres, Deioneus, Magnes, Calyce, Canace, Alcyone, Pisidice and Perimede.

Sisyphus married the Pleiad Merope by whom he became the father of Ornytion (Porphyrion), Glaucus, Thersander and Almus. He was the grandfather of Bellerophon through Glaucus, and Minyas, founder of Orchomenus, through Almus. Another account related that Minyas was Sisyphus's son instead.

In other versions of the myth, Sisyphus was the true father of Odysseus by Anticleia instead of Laërtes.

Mythology

Reign 
Sisyphus was the founder and first king of Ephyra (supposedly the original name of Corinth). King Sisyphus promoted navigation and commerce but was avaricious and deceitful. He killed guests and travelers in his palace, a violation of guest-obligations, which fell under Zeus' domain, thus angering the god. He took pleasure in these killings because they allowed him to maintain his iron-fisted rule.

Conflict with Salmoneus 
Sisyphus and his brother Salmoneus were known to hate each other, and Sisyphus consulted the Oracle of Delphi on just how to kill Salmoneus without incurring any severe consequences for himself. From Homer onward, Sisyphus was famed as the craftiest of men. He seduced Salmoneus' daughter Tyro in one of his plots to kill Salmoneus only for Tyro to slay the children she bore him when she discovered that Sisyphus was planning on using them eventually to dethrone her father.

Cheating death 
Sisyphus betrayed one of Zeus' secrets by revealing the whereabouts of the Asopid Aegina to her father, the river god Asopus, in return for causing a spring to flow on the Corinthian acropolis.

Zeus ordered Thanatos to chain Sisyphus in Tartarus. Sisyphus was curious as to why Charon, whose job it was to guide souls to the underworld, had not appeared on this occasion. Sisyphus slyly asked Thanatos to demonstrate how the chains worked. As Thanatos was granting him his wish, Sisyphus seized the opportunity and trapped Thanatos in the chains instead. Once Thanatos was bound by the strong chains, no one died on Earth, causing an uproar. Annoyed that his battles had lost their fun because his opponents would not die, Ares intervened. The exasperated Ares freed Thanatos, enabling deaths to happen again and turned Sisyphus over to him.

In some versions, Hades was sent to chain Sisyphus and was chained himself. As long as Hades was tied up, nobody could die. Because of this, sacrifices could not be made to the gods and those that were old and sick were suffering. The gods finally threatened to make life so miserable for Sisyphus that he would wish he were dead. He then had no choice but to release Hades.

Before Sisyphus died, he had told his wife to throw his naked body into the middle of the public square (purportedly as a test of his wife's love for him). This caused Sisyphus to end up on the shores of the river Styx when he was brought to the underworld. Complaining to Persephone that this was a sign of his wife's disrespect for him, Sisyphus persuaded her to allow him to return to the upper world. Once back in Ephyra, the spirit of Sisyphus scolded his wife for not burying his body and giving it a proper funeral as a loving wife should. When Sisyphus refused to return to the underworld, he was forcibly dragged back there by Hermes.

In another version of the myth, Persephone was tricked by Sisyphus that he had been conducted to Tartarus by mistake, and so she ordered that he be released.

In Philoctetes by Sophocles, there is a reference to the father of Odysseus (rumoured to have been Sisyphus, and not Laërtes, whom we know as the father in the Odyssey) upon having returned from the dead . Euripides, in Cyclops, also identified Sisyphus as Odysseus' father.

Punishment in the underworld 
As a punishment for his crimes Hades made Sisyphus roll a huge boulder endlessly up a steep hill in Tartarus. The maddening nature of the punishment was reserved for Sisyphus due to his hubristic belief that his cleverness surpassed that of Zeus himself. Hades accordingly displayed his own cleverness by enchanting the boulder into rolling away from Sisyphus before he reached the top which ended up consigning Sisyphus to an eternity of useless efforts and unending frustration. Thus, pointless or interminable activities are sometimes described as "Sisyphean". Sisyphus was a common subject for ancient writers and was depicted by the painter Polygnotus on the walls of the Lesche at Delphi.

Interpretations

According to the solar theory, King Sisyphus is the disk of the sun that rises every day in the east and then sinks into the west. Other scholars regard him as a personification of waves rising and falling, or of the treacherous sea. The 1st-century BC Epicurean philosopher Lucretius interprets the myth of Sisyphus as personifying politicians aspiring for political office who are constantly defeated, with the quest for power, in itself an "empty thing", being likened to rolling the boulder up the hill. Friedrich Welcker suggested that he symbolises the vain struggle of man in the pursuit of knowledge, and Salomon Reinach that his punishment is based on a picture in which Sisyphus was represented rolling a huge stone Acrocorinthus, symbolic of the labour and skill involved in the building of the Sisypheum. Albert Camus, in his 1942 essay The Myth of Sisyphus, saw Sisyphus as personifying the absurdity of human life, but Camus concludes "one must imagine Sisyphus happy" as "The struggle itself towards the heights is enough to fill a man's heart."  More recently, J. Nigro Sansonese, building on the work of Georges Dumézil, speculates that the origin of the name "Sisyphus" is onomatopoetic of the continual back-and-forth, susurrant sound ("siss phuss") made by the breath in the nasal passages, situating the mythology of Sisyphus in a far larger context of archaic (see Proto-Indo-European religion) trance-inducing techniques related to breath control. The repetitive inhalation–exhalation cycle is described esoterically in the myth as an up–down motion of Sisyphus and his boulder on a hill.

In experiments that test how workers respond when the meaning of their task is diminished, the test condition is referred to as the Sisyphusian condition. The two main conclusions of the experiment are that people work harder when their work seems more meaningful, and that people underestimate the relationship between meaning and motivation.

Literary interpretations

 Homer describes Sisyphus in both Book VI of the Iliad and Book XI of the Odyssey.
 Ovid, the Roman poet, makes reference to Sisyphus in the story of Orpheus and Eurydice.  When Orpheus descends and confronts Hades and Persephone, he sings a song so that they will grant his wish to bring Eurydice back from the dead. After this song is sung, Ovid shows how moving it was by noting that Sisyphus, emotionally affected for just a moment, stops his eternal task and sits on his rock, the Latin wording being inque tuo sedisti, Sisyphe, saxo ("and you sat, Sisyphus, on your rock").
 In Plato's Apology, Socrates looks forward to the after-life where he can meet figures such as Sisyphus, who think themselves wise, so that he can question them and find who is wise and who "thinks he is when he is not"
 Albert Camus, the French absurdist, wrote an essay entitled The Myth of Sisyphus, in which he elevates Sisyphus to the status of absurd hero. 

 Franz Kafka repeatedly referred to Sisyphus as a bachelor; Kafkaesque for him were those qualities that brought out the Sisyphus-like qualities in himself. According to Frederick Karl: "The man who struggled to reach the heights only to be thrown down to the depths embodied all of Kafka's aspirations; and he remained himself, alone, solitary." 

 The philosopher Richard Taylor uses the myth of Sisyphus as a representation of a life made meaningless because it consists of bare repetition.
 Wolfgang Mieder has collected cartoons that build on the image of Sisyphus, many of them editorial cartoons.

In popular culture 

 Sisyphus is the subject of the song "Sisyphus" by Andrew Bird, on the album My Finest Work Yet (2019).
 Sisyphus is a character in Hades, a 2020 indie rogue-like game developed by Supergiant Games, voiced by Andrew Marks. His history of cheating death twice is mentioned, the Furies are responsible for the whipping that causes Sisyphus' boulder to roll away from him, and Sisyphus named the boulder "Bouldy". The player character Zagreus is given the option to lessen Sisyphus' sentence in Tartarus.

See also
 The Myth of Sisyphus, a 1942 philosophical essay by Albert Camus which uses Sisyphus' punishment as a metaphor for the absurd
 Sisyphus cooling, a cooling technique named after the Sisyphus myth
 Syzyfowe prace, a novel by Stefan Żeromski
 Comparable characters:
 Naranath Bhranthan, a willing boulder pusher in Indian folklore
 Jan Tregeagle, a Cornish magistrate who must empty Dozmary Pool with a limpet shell or weave sand into rope at Gwenor Cove
 Tantalus, who was similarly punished with a neverending toil
 Wu Gang – also tasked with the impossible: to fell a self-regenerating tree on the Moon

Notes

References 

Homer, The Iliad with an English Translation by A.T. Murray, PhD in two volumes. Cambridge, MA., Harvard University Press; London, William Heinemann, Ltd. 1924. Online version at the Perseus Digital Library.
Homer. Homeri Opera in five volumes. Oxford, Oxford University Press. 1920. Greek text available at the Perseus Digital Library.
Homer, The Odyssey with an English Translation by A.T. Murray, PH.D. in two volumes. Cambridge, MA., Harvard University Press; London, William Heinemann, Ltd. 1919. Online version at the Perseus Digital Library. Greek text available from the same website.

Pausanias, Description of Greece with an English Translation by W.H.S. Jones, Litt.D., and H.A. Ormerod, M.A., in 4 Volumes. Cambridge, MA, Harvard University Press; London, William Heinemann Ltd. 1918. Online version at the Perseus Digital Library
Pausanias, Graeciae Descriptio. 3 vols. Leipzig, Teubner. 1903.  Greek text available at the Perseus Digital Library.
Pseudo-Apollodorus, The Library with an English Translation by Sir James George Frazer, F.B.A., F.R.S. in 2 Volumes, Cambridge, MA, Harvard University Press; London, William Heinemann Ltd. 1921. Online version at the Perseus Digital Library. Greek text available from the same website.
Publius Ovidius Naso, Metamorphoses translated by Brookes More (1859–1942). Boston, Cornhill Publishing Co. 1922. Online version at the Perseus Digital Library.
Publius Ovidius Naso, Metamorphoses. Hugo Magnus. Gotha (Germany). Friedr. Andr. Perthes. 1892. Latin text available at the Perseus Digital Library.

External links

 
 

Mythological tricksters
Princes in Greek mythology
Mythological city founders
Kings of Corinth
Kings in Greek mythology
Heroes who ventured to Hades
Condemned souls in Tartarus
Aeolides
Corinthian characters in Greek mythology
Thessalian characters in Greek mythology
Corinthian mythology
Thessalian mythology
Deeds of Zeus
Deeds of Ares